Notodoris is a genus of sea slugs, dorid nudibranchs, marine gastropod molluscs in the family Aegiridae. It has been treated as a synonym of Aegires but re-established on the basis of radula and jaw characters.

Species
Species in the genus Notodoris include:
 Notodoris citrina Bergh, 1875 - type species
 Notodoris gardineri Eliot, 1906
 Notodoris lanzarotensis Moro & Ortea, 2015
 Notodoris minor Eliot, 1904
 Notodoris serenae Gosliner & Behrens, 1997
Species considered to be synonyms:
 Notodoris megastigmata Allan, 1932 Notodoris gardineri Eliot, 1906

References

Aegiridae
Gastropod genera